Francisco P. Temple (February 13, 1822 – April 27, 1880) served on the first Los Angeles County Board of Supervisors  in 1852.

Biography
Francisco Pliny Fisk (F.P.F) Temple was born in Reading, Massachusetts was the youngest of a family of ten children.  He started for Alta California a Mexican territory, by the way of Cape Horn, arriving at Los Angeles in the summer of 1841. There his brother, Jonathan Temple, who had established himself as a pioneer merchant in 1827, was then the leading merchant of the Pueblo de Los Angeles.  As his half-brother Jonathan's junior by 26 years, he was born after Jonathan went to sea and moved to California. When F.P.F. Temple arrived in Los Angeles, he had never met his brother.  Between 1841 and 1849 he was a Clerk in Jonathan Temple's Store in Los Angeles.  Pliny had been nicknamed "Templito," or "Little Temple" as by the natives because of his short height of five feet, four inches (163 cm).  Phiny Fisk Temple had been baptized in the Catholic faith at the San Gabriel Mission shortly prior to accepting the Christian name of Francisco P.F. Temple.

In 1845, Temple married Antonia Margarita Workman (July 26, 1830 – January 24, 1892) the daughter of William Workman and his Taos Native American wife Maria Nicolasa Urioste de Valencia. They had 12 children.  In 1851, Workman gave Temple an undivided half share in Rancho La Merced located 12 miles (19 km) east of Los Angeles where he made his home. He planted a vineyard of 30,000 vines, 30 acres (120,000 m²) of fruit trees, and a garden.  Temple became involved with real estate, and with breeding and selling cattle.

In 1850 he was elected to be the Los Angeles city treasurer, and in 1852 he served on the first Los Angeles County Board of Supervisors. In 1856 he had Temple Block built, which would become the undisputed center of commerce and social life in the town, for its saloon, the offices of the town's most prominent lawyers and some of its best retail clothing stores.

In 1868 Temple with his father-in-law William Workman and Isaias W. Hellman formed the banking house of Hellman, Temple & Co. Three years later Hellman dropped out of the business, but the partnership between Temple and Workman continued as the Temple & Workman Bank in a downtown Los Angeles area known as the Temple Block.  In 1875, when nearly every bank in the state closed its doors for a time,  Temple & Workman  Bank went bankrupt due to mismanagement. Both men lost everything. Temple never recovered from the financial disaster, and Workman committed suicide a year later.

On April 27, 1880, Temple died and is buried in the Workman and Temple family El Campo Santo Cemetery.

See also
Workman-Temple family

References

California pioneers
Foreign residents of Mexican California
Politicians from Los Angeles
1822 births
1880 deaths
American emigrants to Mexico
History of Los Angeles
Los Angeles County Board of Supervisors
San Gabriel Valley
19th-century American politicians